Fleitz is a surname. Notable people with the surname include:

Beverly Baker Fleitz (1930–2014), American tennis player 
Frederick H. Fleitz (born 1962), American intelligence official

See also
Fleita